Kelana may be :

Gitua language
Kala language